Stojan Protić (28 January 1857 – 28 October 1923) was a Serbian politician and writer. He served as the prime minister of the Kingdom of Serbs, Croats, and Slovenes between 1918 and 1919, and again in 1920, later called Yugoslavia. He is best remembered as the key theoretician of Serbian parliamentarism.

Biography
Stojan M. Protić was born in Kruševac. His great-great-grandfather (čukundeda), Toma Dečanac, moved from the village of Dečani with his wife and two sons, to Kruševac.

Having studied history and philosophy in Belgrade's Grandes écoles (Velika škola), Protić briefly worked in government service before dedicating himself to journalism and becoming editor of Samouprava ("Autonomy"), the official daily newspaper of the People's Radical Party. In 1884 he became editor of another paper, Odjek ("Echo"), and advocated changing Serbia's constitution. He ran in the 1887 elections and was elected to Parliament. As secretary of the Constitutional committee in 1888 Protić participated in drafting the Serbian Constitution, perhaps one of the most liberal constitutions in late nineteenth-century Europe. He became an influential ideologist of the People's Radical Party and a talented journalist. He continued to write numerous articles for several political magazines while in office.

Protić was often elected as a deputy of the People's Radical Party in the Serbian Parliament: 1887, 1897, 1901, 1903, 1905, 1906, 1908 and 1912. Known as an ardent polemist and advocate of British-type democracy, he served as a deputy in the first Yugoslav parliament (1920) as well.

He was Minister of Interior in various governments in Serbia after 1903 (Administrations of Jovan Avakumović, Sava Grujić, Nikola Pašić), as well as the Minister of Finance (1909-1912). As Minister of the Interior at the outbreak of World War I, he worked the Serbian reply to the Austro-Hungarian Ultimatum during the July Crisis. He supported the Corfu Declaration (1917), opposed the Geneva Declaration (November 9, 1918), and sought to revise the Vidovdan Constitution. In December 1918 Protić was appointed Prime Minister of the Kingdom of Serbs, Croats, and Slovenes by Prince-Regent Aleksandar Karađorđević. His government, unfortunately, lasted from 20 December 1918 to 16 August 1919. He was Prime Minister once more from 19 February to 17 May 1920. In 1923, after leaving the Radicals, led by Pašić, he formed a new party the Independent Radical Party (Nezavisna Radikalna Sranka) but failed to gain support. After losing his parliamentary seat in his traditional constituency in Kruševac, Protić quit politics.

His books translated into English, German, Russian and French were published under the pseudonym "Balkanicus".

Death 

Protić died of heart disease in Belgrade in 1923.

His great-grandson is Milan St. Protić, a historian, politician and diplomat who served as the Mayor of Belgrade.

Selected works
O Makedoniji i Makedoncima, Št. Koste Taušanovića, Beograd, 1888.
Tajna konvencija između Srbije i Austrougarske, Št. D. Obradović, Beograd 1909.
Odlomci iz ustavne I narodne borbe u Srbiji, vol. I-II,  Št. D. Obradović, Beograd, 1911-1912.Albanski problem i Srbija i Austrougarska, G. Kon, Beograd,  1913Srbi i Bugari u Balkanskom ratu, napisao Balkanicus, Geca Kon, Beograd 1913Das albanische Problem und die Beziehungen zwischen Serbien und Österreich-Ungarn,  von Balkanicus (ins Deutsche übertragen von L. Markowitsch), O. Wigand, Leipzig, 1913.Le problème albanais, la Serbie et l'Autriche-Hongrie, par Balkanicus, Augustin Challamel, Paris, 1913.La Bulgarie : ses ambitions, sa trahison : accompagné des textes de tous les traité secrets et correspondances diplomatiques, par Balcanicus, Armand Colin, Paris, 1915.
 Balkanicus, The Aspirations of Bulgaria'', Simkin, Marshall, Hamilton, Kent & Co. LTD, London 1915.

References

Sources

1857 births
1923 deaths
Politicians from Kruševac
People from the Principality of Serbia
People's Radical Party politicians
Finance ministers of Serbia
Prime Ministers of Yugoslavia
Finance ministers of Yugoslavia
Writers from Kruševac
Foreign ministers of Serbia
Interior ministers of Serbia